James Thomas Berryman (June 8, 1902 – August 12, 1971) was an American political cartoonist who won the 1950 Pulitzer Prize for Editorial Cartooning. Born in Washington, D.C., Berryman was the son of Clifford Berryman, also a Pulitzer Prize-winning cartoonist. The two Berrymans are the only parent-child pair to win Pulitzer Prizes in the same category.

References

External links
 Jim Berryman Political Cartoons, 1928-1963 at the National Archives Catalog
Inventory of the James Thomas Berryman papers, 1903-1971 at the American Heritage Center
Billy Ireland Cartoon Library & Museum Art Database

1902 births
1971 deaths
American editorial cartoonists
Pulitzer Prize for Editorial Cartooning winners
The Washington Star people
Artists from Washington, D.C.